The Corrupt Practices Investigation Bureau (CPIB) is a government agency in Singapore under the Prime Minister's Office (PMO),formerly Anti Corruption Branch of Singapore Police Force. The CPIB has the mandate to investigate into any acts or forms of corruption in the public and private sectors in Singapore, and in the course of doing so, any other offences under any written law.

The CPIB was established in 1952 and placed under the purview of the Attorney-General at that time. Having been under the Ministry of Home Affairs (MHA) during its earlier years, the Bureau has remained under the purview of the Prime Minister's Office (PMO) since 1969. The CPIB has been credited for being one of the main contributors to the transformation of Singapore into one of the world's least corrupt nations. Some notable cases tackled by the CPIB are the operation against Chap Ji Kee lottery syndicates, the corruption trial against Minister Wee Toon Boon and the investigation of Minister Teh Cheang Wan.

The CPIB operates with functional independence, and is headed by a director who reports directly to the Prime Minister.

The CPIB may also, in the course of its investigations, come across cases which reveal corruption-prone areas or loopholes in procedures in government departments. Based on its findings, CPIB may review the department concerned and recommend changes in their procedures. In addition to its primary function of investigating corruption offences, the CPIB also undertakes public education and community outreach efforts relating to anti-corruption.

Legal framework

Enacted on 17 June 1960, the Prevention of Corruption Act (PCA) is the primary anti-corruption law in Singapore. The following are provided for under the PCA:

 Powers for the CPIB to investigate bribery in all forms, both monetary and non-monetary in nature, and in both the public and private sectors;
 Extraterritorial powers for the CPIB to deal with corrupt acts committed by a Singapore citizen outside Singapore as though these were committed in Singapore;
 Fine of up to S$100,000 or an imprisonment term not exceeding 5 years, or to both, for each count of corruption;
 Fine of up to S$100,000 or an imprisonment term not exceeding 7 years, or to both, for each count of corruption in relation to a contract or a proposal for a contract with the Government;
 Presumption where any gratification given or received by a person in the employment of the Government or of a public body is deemed corrupt, and the burden of proof to rebut the presumption lies with the person;
 Forfeiture of gratification received in the form of a penalty equivalent to the amount of bribes received upon conviction; and
 Non-disclosure of the name or address of any informer, or any matter which might lead to the discovery of the informer's identity.

Case studies
There are case studies in both public and private sectors.

In April 2019, the CPIB reported that it received 358 corruption-related reports, and registered 107 new cases for investigation in 2018. Cases involving the private sector continued to form the majority, or 88%, of all new cases registered for investigation by the CPIB in 2018. The conviction rate remained high, averaging 98% from 2014 to 2018. The CPIB is committed to fight corruption with resolve, by strengthening its interview tradecraft, intelligence and investigative support capabilities.

See also
Corruption in Singapore
 Law of Singapore
 Law enforcement in Singapore
 Independent Commission Against Corruption (Hong Kong), agency inspired by the CPIB

References

External links
 Corrupt Practices Investigation Bureau - Official website.

Organisations of the Singapore Government
Law enforcement agencies of Singapore
Anti-corruption agencies